The first cabinet of Ion C. Brătianu ruled Romania from 24 July 1876 to 24 November 1878.

Ministers
The ministers of the cabinet were as follows:

President of the Council of Ministers:
Ion C. Brătianu (24 July 1876 – 24 November 1878)
Minister of the Interior: 
George Vernescu (24 July 1876 - 27 January 1877)
Ion C. Brătianu (27 January 1877 - 26 March 1878)
Constantin A. Rosetti (26 March - 17 November 1878)
(interim) Mihail Kogălniceanu (17 - 24 November 1878)
Minister of Foreign Affairs: 
Nicolae Ionescu (24 July 1876 - 25 March 1877)
(interim) Ion Câmpineanu (25 March - 3 April 1877)
Mihail Kogălniceanu (3 April 1877 - 24 November 1878)
Minister of Finance:
Ion C. Brătianu (24 July 1876 - 27 January 1877)
Dimitrie A. Sturdza (27 January - 21 February 1877)
(interim) Ion C. Brătianu (21 February - 20 August 1877)
(interim) Ion Câmpineanu (20 August - 23 September 1877)
Ion Câmpineanu (23 September 1877 - 24 November 1878)
Minister of Justice:
Eugeniu Stătescu (24 July 1876 - 27 January 1877)
ion Câmpineanu (27 January - 23 September 1877)
Eugeniu Stătescu (23 September 1877 - 24 November 1878)
Minister of War:
Col. Gheorghe Slăniceanu (24 July 1876 - 2 April 1877)
Col. Alexandru Cernat (2 April - 20 August 1877)
(interim) Ion C. Brătianu (20 August 1877 - 17 March 1878)
Gen. Alexandru Cernat (17 March - 24 November 1878)
Minister of Religious Affairs and Public Instruction:
Gheorghe Chițu (24 July 1876 - 31 October 1878)
(interim) Ion C. Brătianu (31 October - 24 November 1878)
Minister of Public Works:
Dimitrie A. Sturdza (24 July 1876 - 5 January 1877)
(interim) George Vernescu (5 - 27 January 1877)
Ioan Docan (27 January - 21 August 1877)
Petre S. Aurelian (21 August 1877 - 26 March 1878)
(interim) Ion C. Brătianu (26 March 1878 - 24 November 1878)

References

Bratianu, I. 1
Cabinets established in 1876
Cabinets disestablished in 1878
1876 establishments in Romania
1878 disestablishments in Romania